Garra mcclellandi (Cauvery garra) is a species of cyprinid fish in the genus Garra which is found in mountain streams in the southern Western Ghats of India.

References 

mcclellandi
Fish described in 1849
Freshwater fish of India